Enjoy Full (stylized as Enjoy☆Full) is the second mini-album of Japanese voice actor and J-Pop singer, Nobuhiko Okamoto. It was released in Japan on 5 June 2013 on Kiramune.

Summary 
Two types of release Edition luxury and board, DVD was recorded making and PV of future sketch is included in the former. In addition, message card is enclosed as Limited benefits of various.

Track listing

DVD (only First Press Limited Edition)
 グッドラック -Music Video-
 making of グッドラック
 TRAILER

Charts

References

External links
 ランティスによる紹介ページ
 豪華盤
 通常盤

2013 EPs